Sunshine Moonlight is the eighth studio album of Japanese singer Toshinobu Kubota, released on September 5, 1995. The album credited under the name, Toshi Kubota. This was also Kubota's first English-language album. The album's musical style ranges from 1980s–90s R&B and pop to funk elements such go-go. Synth instrumentation was not employed in recording most of the song as the album contains live instrumentation.

In 1996, Kubota released a follow up album, La La La Love Thang, and proceed with his tour, which was titled Oyeees! Tour.

Recording and production
Kubota began working on the project in 1995. After the release of his previous album "Bumpin' Voyage" in January 1995, Kubota returned the studio to begin recording a new album. Songs from "Bumpin' Voyage" were re-recorded and mastered for the "Sunshine, Moonlight" album. The songs that were re-recorded were "DJ Fonk / Funk It Up", "6 to 8 / My Love (6 to 8)", "Too Lite 2 Do / Too Light to Do", "Sunshine, Moonlight", "Oh Honey", "Not Yet! / Ain't Nobody", and "Tawawa Hit Parade". Kubota also wrote and recorded new songs for the project which include "Holding You", "Jam With Me", "Angel", "Get It Together", and "Nice & Ez".

In addition to producing, Kubota also enlisted in the production team of Kim Burse, William Burke, Camus Mare Celli, Israel Embry, Kaz Hayashida, Ralph MacDonald, Rex Rideout, William Salter, D'Wayne Wiggins, and Bill Withers. All the song were written or co-written by Kubota except the song "Just the Two of Us".

Release and promotion

On September 5, 1995, Kubota released his eighth album "Sunshine, Moonlight", which is his first English album. The album was also Kubota's first international release outside Japan. The album peaked number one on the Oricon Albums chart and sold over a half of million units.

Singles
The album's lead single "Funk It Up" was released in the United States in August 1995. A music video was shot for the single. On October 21, 1995, Kubota released a maxi-single EP "Funk It Up / Nice & EZ". The singles charted at number ninety-one on the Oricon Singles chart.

In June 1996, the second single "Just the Two of Us", a duet with Caron Wheeler, was also released in the United States. Kubota and Wheeler shot a music video for their rendition of the song. The single charted at number thirty on the Oricon Singles chart.

Tours
In 1996, Kubota began the Oyeees! Tour. The tour was to promote the albums "Bumpin' Voyage", "Sunshine, Moonlight", and "La La La Love Thang". This was Kubota's first nationwide tour, which lasted for the remainder of 1996. During his performance at Yoyogi Daiichi Taiikukan in 1996, the show was filmed and released on VHS and DVD on March 1, 1997.

Track listing
 "Funk It Up"
 "Just the Two of Us" (featuring Caron Wheeler)
 "Too Light to Do"
 "Holding You"
 "Jam With Me"
 "Angel"
 "Get It Together"
 "Nice & EZ" 
 "My Love (6 to 8)"
 "Oh Honey"
 "Sunshine, Moonlight"
 "PaLaLeYa"
 "Ain't Nobody"
 "Tawawa Hit Parade"

Personnel

 Tawatha Agee: Vocals (Background)
 Alex Alexander: Drums, Performer
 Larry Alexander: Engineer
 Louis Alfred III: Engineer
 Ben Arrindell: Assistant Engineer
 Herb Besson: Performer, Primary Artist, Trombone
 Chris Botti: Guest Artist, Performer, Primary Artist, Trumpet
 Randy Bowland: Guitar, Performer, Primary Artist
 Michael Brauer: Mixing
 David Bright: Performer, Primary Artist, Vocoder
 Gerry Brown: Mixing
 Mark Burdett: Art Direction, Design
 William Burke: Keyboards, Primary Artist, Producer, Programming
 Kim Burse: Composer, MC, Primary Artist, Vocals (Background)
 Mike Campbell: Guest Artist, Guitar, Performer, Primary Artist
 Jean Carbain: Design Assistant
 Joi Cardwell: Guest Artist, Performer, Primary Artist, Vocals (Background)
 Camus Mare Celli: Composer, Keyboards, Performer, Primary Artist, Producer, Programming
 Gordon Chambers: Composer, Performer, Primary Artist, Vocals (Background)
 Christian: Performer, Primary Artist
 Robin Clark: Vocals (Background)
 Eric Cody: Primary Artist
 Martin Czembor: Assistant Engineer
 Tim Donovan: Assistant Engineer
 Israel Embry: Keyboards, Performer, Primary Artist, Producer, Programming
 Mike Fisher: Assistant Engineer
 Lolly Grodner: Engineer
 Mick Guzauski: Mixing
 Omar Hakim: Drums, Guest Artist, Performer, Primary Artist
 Andricka Hall: Performer, Primary Artist, Vocals (Background)
 Kaz Hayashida: Associate Producer
 Hiroshi Inagaki: Producer
 John James: Performer, Primary Artist, Vocals (Background)
 Bashiri Johnson: Percussion, Performer, Primary Artist
 Steve Kroon: Percussion, Performer, Primary Artist
 Toshi Kubota: Composer, Performer, Primary Artist, Producer, Vocals (Background)
 Mark Ledford: Performer, Primary Artist, Trumpet
 Ralph MacDonald: Composer
 Andy Marvel: Keyboards, Performer, Primary Artist, Producer, Programming
 Tony Maserati: Mixing
 Steve McLoughlin: Engineer
 Vladimir Meller: Assistant Engineer
 Jeff Mironov: Performer, Primary Artist, Sitar (Electric)
 Dave O'Donnell: Engineer
 Leonard Pickett: Performer, Primary Artist, Saxophone
 Rex Rideout: Keyboards, Performer, Primary Artist, Producer, Programming
 Nile Rodgers: Guest Artist, Guitar, Performer, Primary Artist
 William Salter: Composer
 John Seymour: Assistant Engineer
 Terry T.: Performer, Primary Artist, Synthesizer Bass
 Chris Theis: Assistant Engineer
 Thorn: Performer, Primary Artist
 Fonzi Thornton: Vocals (Background)
 Audrey Wheeler: Guest Artist, Performer, Primary Artist, Vocals (Background)
 Caron Wheeler: Guest Artist, Performer, Primary Artist
 D'Wayne Wiggins: Bass, Composer, Guest Artist, Guitar, Keyboards, Performer, Primary Artist, Producer, Programming, Vocals (Background)
 Bill Withers: Composer

References

1995 albums
Toshinobu Kubota albums
Columbia Records albums